James Stables (November 25, 1860 – February 17, 1926) was a Scottish-Canadian politician. He served in the Legislative Assembly of British Columbia from 1900 to 1903 from the electoral district of Cassiar.

Election results

References

Scottish emigrants to Canada
1860 births
1926 deaths
Members of the Legislative Assembly of British Columbia